Hayley Gene Penner (born November 5, 1985) is a Canadian singer, songwriter and author based in Los Angeles. She is best known for the songs she has written for artists including The Chicks, Sabrina Claudio, Lennon Stella, Charlotte Lawrence and The Chainsmokers. As of 2018, Penner has been releasing music under her full name and in September 2020, she released her debut album, People You Follow, with a memoir of the same name.

Early life and education 
Penner was born and raised in Winnipeg, Canada, the eldest daughter of Canadian children's music performer Fred Penner and Odette Heyn, a choreographer and founder of a contemporary dance school.

At age 17, Penner was hosting CBC children's programming and lending her voice to commercials for companies like Cheez Whiz, McDonald's, Kraft Dinner and Hamburger Helper. She was the Manitoba regional host for Kids' CBC from 2003 to 2005.

Penner moved to Toronto, where she studied journalism at Ryerson University and formed the electronic dance band TuZO with a friend. After university, Penner worked at Châtelaine before spending six months writing restaurant reviews for a magazine in London.

Music career

Songwriting 
Penner moved to Los Angeles in 2011 to sign a publishing deal with BMG Chrysalis and The Messengers.

As a songwriter, Penner writes for other artists, including 11 songs with Sabrina Claudio across her first two projects Confidently Lost and About Time, 7 with Alina Baraz, and other artists such as Lennon Stella, Charlotte Lawrence, and Sinead Harnett. Hayley wrote “Everybody Loves You” on The Chicks' 2020 return album, Gaslighter.

Penner's songwriting partnership with Charlotte Lawrence continued with her joining Lawrence on tour and as an opening act at New York’s Bowery Ballroom and Los Angeles’s The Troubadour.

Solo career 
In 2011, Penner signed with Universal Music Canada and began releasing and writing music under the name W. Darling. Penner released two EPs comprising three songs each in 2015, "The Lost Girls Chapter One" and "Chapter Two".

In 2017, Penner split from Universal Music Canada and began releasing music through AWAL under her full name Hayley Gene Penner, moving away from the electronic pop returning to her roots as an acoustic, folk singer songwriter.

Penner released five singles in 2018, two in 2019, and five in 2020. Her full debut album, titled "People You Follow" is scheduled for release in September 2020.

Memoir 
Alongside her debut album, Penner wrote a memoir, also titled People You Follow, about her experience as a female songwriter in the music industry and the hidden, toxic side of the business. The book, released in Fall 2020, was described by Lena Dunham as "a fucked up Alice in Wonderland journey down the rabbit hole of LA’s most subtly toxic industry, and it’s also funny. brilliant, coy, playful and wise." Cindy Crawford called the book "both heartbreaking and humorous" depiction "of how we, as women, struggle to find our value through the eyes of others."

Discography

Albums 
 People You Follow (2020)

Songs

Songwriting credits

Notes

Footnotes

References 
 
 
 
 

1992 births
Living people
Canadian pop singers
Canadian women singer-songwriters
Canadian singer-songwriters
21st-century Canadian women singers